Kahalabad (also Romanized as Kahalābād; also known as Kahlā, Kahlāābād, Kahlahābād, and Kahlehābād) is a village in Khararud Rural District, in the Central District of Khodabandeh County, Zanjan Province, Iran. At the 2006 census, its population was 569, in 118 families.

References 

Populated places in Khodabandeh County